Ferrandina-Pomarico is a railway station serving Ferrandina and Pomarico, Italy.

Data

The station (usually called Ferrandina station) is located on the Battipaglia–Metaponto railway. The train services are operated by Trenitalia.

The station was modernised in 2005.

The Italian government in August 2017 has decided that the station will be connected to the new station of Matera by a modern railway.

Train services
The station is served by the following service(s):

Intercity services Rome - Naples - Salerno - Taranto
Regional services (Treno regionale) Naples - Salerno - Potenza - Metaponto - Taranto

See also
 Battipaglia–Metaponto railway

References

This article is based upon a translation of the Italian language version as at June 2014.

Railway stations in Basilicata
Buildings and structures in the Province of Matera